Al Lerner (1933–2002) was an American billionaire and philanthropist, owner of the Cleveland Browns.

Al Lerner may also refer to:

 Al Lerner (composer) (1919-2014), American jazz pianist and composer from the Big Band era
 Alan Jay Lerner (1918–1986), musical theatre lyricist
 Abram Lerner (born 1913), also known as Al Lerner, founder of the Hirshhorn Museum and Sculpture Garden

See also
 Lerner (disambiguation)